Saint October is a Japanese anime television series created by Konami Digital Entertainment and animated by Studio Comet. It was also adapted into a manga series by Kiira (stylized as Kiira~☆), which was serialized in the Japanese magazine Monthly Comic Blade published by Mag Garden in August 2006. The anime series premiered on Chiba TV on January 4, 2007 in Japan. The series revolves around three young girls who work for a detective agency who one day receive magical powers from a mysterious boy. The series' portrayal of magic makes extensive use of tarot symbolism.

Plot
The story begins during a case to catch a mysterious masked kidnapper who has been kidnapping young boys for a strange man he answers to as his boss and leader. Kotono is a young girl and a member of the agency, who, due to her young age, is working harder during this case. One night after returning home late alone, Kotono runs into a young boy who's crying alone. With nowhere else to take him, Kotono brings him back to her home at Joshua's church where it is discovered that he has amnesia and cannot remember even his own name. While there, Natsuki Shirafuji, Kotono's friend and fellow detective, arrives to add further information to the kidnapping case. Suddenly, the masked kidnapper appears and successfully kidnaps the boy, but Kotono chases after him and gets the boy back after a short scuffle. Just when all looks lost, the boy uses a magical power to bestow unto Kotono a similar power in order to defeat the kidnapper. After she won, he reveals that he has remembered what his name is: Ewan. Now the focus has turned to who is the kidnapper's boss who has been pursuing Ewan.

Characters

Protagonists
 
Kotono is a young, usually cheerful, girl working for the Kuroki Detective Agency. As a child, she was abandoned near a church with no memories of who she was or where she came from. The church's priest, Joshua, took her in as his own daughter. Her card is Justice and she transforms into Loli Black. Her weapon is a sword which she uses as a final attack on the enemy.

 
Natsuki is Kotono's good friend of equal age and fellow member of the agency. She comes from a rich family. Her card is Moon and she transforms into Loli White. Her weapon is a pair a nun chucks.

 
Misaki is a mysterious and agile girl. In the past episodes it was shown that her hometown was attacked and that she has a mission. Her card is Strength and she transforms into Loli Red. Her weapon is a bow and arrow

 
Joshua is a priest who is a member of the detective agency and Kotono's foster father after she was left at his church. Despite Kotono insisting he is merely her foster father, he thinks of himself as her real father.

 
Kōshirō is head of the Kuroki Detective Agency though is often bogged down by work and doesn't get much respect from his colleagues.

 
Ewan is a young boy who has amnesia. He initially gave Kotono her magical powers and the other Goth Loli.

 
 Artista is a fortune teller who is also an old friend of Joshua and Kōshirō, she sometimes helps the girls out with her fortune-telling abilities.

Antagonists
 

 

 
Esmeralda is a new antagonist that appears in the middle of the series, she is the younger sister of the first antagonist Herlock.

 
Originally he is the masked man who steals the boys and takes them away. He took it up as a mission but soon got bored from doing it. After he kidnaps them he keeps them in his room, allowing them to destroy the place. He works for Kurtz and, he too, had a card. His number was the "Number 1" card which gave him the Magician ability. He was the first to get judgment from Kotono and soon after was jailed. His name is considered to have come from Captain Harlock.

Others

Adaptations

Anime
The Saint October anime series, created by Konami Digital Entertainment, first aired in Japan on January 4, 2007 on Chiba TV and is set to contain 26 episodes. The first DVD will go on sale on March 21, 2007.

Episodes

Theme songs
Opening theme "Wheel of fortune" by Azusa Kataoka, Yukari Fukui and Yu Kobayashi
Ending Theme 1 "Michi naru Basho e" by Yukari Fukui(Ep 1-10, 12-13)
Ending Theme 2 "Sora no Kotoba" by Yu Kobayashi(Ep 14-25)
Ending Theme 3 "Melow Stereo" by Azusa Kataoka, Yukari Fukui and Yu Kobayashi(Ep 26)

Manga
The Saint October manga adaptation was first serialized in the Japanese shōnen manga magazine Monthly Comic Blade in August 2006, published by Mag Garden. It is illustrated by Kiira~☆.

References

External links
Saint October official website 
Saint October official website 

2006 manga
Konami
Mag Garden manga
Magical girl anime and manga
Mystery anime and manga
Shōnen manga
Anime with original screenplays